The Bristol Coalfield is a geologically complex coalfield in the west of England. Comprising the coal-bearing rocks arranged around the Coalpit Heath Syncline and Kingsdown Anticline, it extends beneath the eastern parts of the city of Bristol and northwards through southern Gloucestershire. The coalfield is sometimes referred to together with the Somerset Coalfield, which lies to its south, as the Bristol and Somerset Coalfield. There are also two outlying coal-mining areas, the Severn Coalfield and the Nailsea Basin which are described below.

Several coal seams are named in the sequence in the Bristol Coalfield.  The seams are listed stratigraphically with the uppermost (youngest) at the head of the list and the lowermost (oldest) at the foot. Not all seams are named, nor are all seams present at any one location.
Upper Coal Measures
 Pensford No 1
 Pensford No 2
 Pensford No 3
 Bromley No 4
 Bromley No 5
 Rock Vein of Brislington
 Salridge
 Mangotsfield (?Salridge)
 Stinking
 Corston
 Cock (?=Millgrit & Rag)
 Coke
 Chick (?=Buff)
 Hen (?=Parrot)
 Coking

Lower and Middle Coal Measures
 New Smith's (?Yate Little, Warmley)
 ?Yate Hard
 Lower Five
 Kingswood & Bedminster Great
 Giller Inn
 Kingswood Little
 Soundwell Hard Venture
 Ashton Great
 Ashton Little

Severn Coalfield 
Within the Upper Coal Measures of the outlying 'Avonmouth Basin' are the Avonmouth No 1 and No 2 coals. This is sometimes known as the Severn Coalfield. It lies several miles to the west of the main Bristol Coalfield and extends under the Severn Estuary as far as Portskewett. It is also largely obscured by thick deposits of estuarine alluvium. Coal was also worked on a very small scale in the rocks of the Clapton-in-Gordano inlier just to the south of the Severn Coalfield.

Nailsea Basin 
In the small 'Nailsea Basin'  to the west of Bristol, a sequence of Coal Measures rocks are preserved within a syncline. These rocks are connected at depth with those of the Somerset Coalfield; though it lies close to the main body of the Bristol Coalfield, it is not connected with it. Two seams are known from the upper Coal Measures and twelve from the Lower and Middle Coal Measures within this 'basin'. Only those indicated thus - w - were worked to any great extent:

Upper Coal Measures
 Grace's (0.9m) w
Lower and Middle Coal Measures
 White's Top (1.1m) w
 Golden Valley
 Backwell Little
 Dog (0.9m) w

See also
Bristol Miners' Association

References

 
Coal mining regions in England